The 2021–22 New York Islanders season was the 50th season in the franchise's history. It was their first season in UBS Arena. Before the season, the Islanders lost Jordan Eberle to the Seattle Kraken in the 2021 NHL Expansion Draft.

On April 17, 2022, the Islanders were eliminated from playoff contention following a 4–2 loss to the Toronto Maple Leafs. After the season ended, the Islanders fired Barry Trotz as their head coach.

Standings

Divisional standings

Conference standings

Schedule and results

Preseason
The preseason schedule was published on August 16, 2021. The Islanders' game against the New Jersey Devils on October 7, 2021, was cancelled due to a power outage at Prudential Center in Newark, New Jersey.

Regular season
The regular season schedule was published on July 22, 2021, with only about a handful of games scheduled in February because NHL players were planning to participate in the 2022 Winter Olympics. However, on December 22 , the NHL announced that its players would not participate in the 2022 Winter Olympics due to the ongoing COVID-19 pandemic.

Player statistics
As of May 1, 2022

Skaters

Goaltenders

Transactions
The Islanders have been involved in the following transactions during the 2021–22 season.

Trades

Free agents

Waivers

Contract terminations

Retirement

Signings

Draft picks

Below are the New York Islanders' selections at the 2021 NHL Entry Draft, which was held on July 23 and 24, 2021, in a remote format, with teams convening via videoconferencing, and Commissioner Gary Bettman announcing selections from the NHL Network studios in Secaucus, New Jersey.

Notes:
 The Edmonton Oilers' second-round pick went to the New York Islanders as the result of a trade on July 16, 2021, that sent Nick Leddy to the Detroit Red Wings in exchange for Richard Panik and this pick.

Notes

References

New York Islanders seasons
New York Islanders
New York Islanders
New York Islanders
New York Islanders